Kalol Junction Railway Station is a railway station in Kalol, Gandhinagar of Gujarat, India. Its code is KLL. Kalol lies on the main railway line connecting Ahmedabad to Jaipur. Kalol Junction railway station is under  Division of Western Railways.  is connected to Kalol via Kalol - Gandhinagar - Khodiyar line. Passenger and Express trains halt here.

Major Trains

Following trains halt at Kalol Junction in both directions:

 14707/08 Bandra Terminus - Bikaner Ranakpur Express
 19031/32 Ahmedabad - Haridwar Yoga Express
 19707/08 Bandra Terminus - Jaipur Amrapur Aravali Express

References

 Railway stations in Gandhinagar district
 Ahmedabad railway division
 Railway junction stations in Gujarat